Ives Grove is an unincorporated community located in the town of Yorkville, Racine County, Wisconsin, United States. The Ives Grove Golf Course and Country Club, the Racine Convention and Tourism Center, and Evans Park are all located nearby.

Notes

Unincorporated communities in Racine County, Wisconsin
Unincorporated communities in Wisconsin